This is an incomplete list of the roughly 1000 cities and towns that have stolpersteine. It is organized in alphabetical order and by country. Where the number of stolpersteine is known or can be approximated, that information has been included, along with the first installation date, if known. Where the number of people deported by the Nazis is known, that information is included for comparison to the number of stolperstein memorials in that city.

From the artist's own website:
By December 2013, the stolperstein project had realized more than 43,500 memorials in approximately 1000 cities and towns; many more have applied for them. Stolpersteine are found in Austria, Hungary, the Netherlands, Belgium, the Czech Republic, Russia, Croatia, France, Poland, Slovenia, Italy, Norway, Ukraine, Switzerland, Slovakia and Luxembourg.

As of August 20, 2014, there have been laid over 48,000 stolpersteine in 18 countries in Europe, making the project the world's largest memorial.

On 11 January 2015 Stolperstein No. 50,000 was installed in Turin, Italy for Eleonora Levi.

In May 2018 almost 69,000 stolpersteine in 21 countries in Europe have been installed.

On October 23, 2018, Stolperstein No. 70,000 was installed in Frankfurt, Germany for Willy Zimmerer.

Austria 

Carinthia:
 Klagenfurt (24 Stolpersteine)
 Lower Austria:
 Bad Erlach (2)
 Hinterbrühl (2)
 Krems an der Donau (1)
 Mödling (near Vienna): 22 stolpersteine, as of August 2006
 Neunkirchen (34)
 Wiener Neustadt (more than 100)
 Salzburg (state)
 Anif (1)
 Hallein (40)
 Salzburg: at least 415 stolpersteine, as of September 2018; see also 
 Sankt Georgen bei Salzburg (2), the first Stolpersteine in Austria and the first ones being officially admitted by a municipal administration worldwide
 St. Johann im Pongau (8)
 Styria: 
Graz (94)
Leoben (10)
 Upper Austria
 Aigen-Schlägl (4)
 Altheim (1)
 Braunau am Inn (Adolf Hitler's birthplace): first stolpersteine laid on August 11, 2006 (2) (see also Stolpersteine in the district of Braunau am Inn)
 Hochburg-Ach (1)
 Maria Schmolln (1)
 Moosdorf (2)
 St. Radegund (1)
 Sankt Veit im Innkreis (1)
 Wels (6)
 Vorarlberg:
 Hohenems (9)
 Lingenau (7)
 Vienna
There are many Stolpersteine in Vienna. At least two organisations with their own databank (incl. a map) promote the implementation of Stolpersteine in Vienna.

Belgium 

 Brussels: first pavés de mémoire (French for stolpersteine) installed on May 13, 2009, the first stolpersteine in Belgium (about 150 Stolpersteine)
 Antwerp (3)
 Charleroi (11), see: Stolpersteine in Charleroi
 Eupen (5)
 Ghent (4)
 Leuven (Stolperschwelle and several Stolpersteine)
 Liege (13)
 Mol (2)
 Sint-Truiden (11)

Croatia 
 Rijeka The first 4 stolpersteine in Croatia were laid in Rijeka on May 13, 2013. (see: Stolpersteine in Croatia)

Czech Republic 
 Brno
 Kolín
 Neratovice
 Olomouc
 Ostrava
 Prague: first 10 stolpersteine laid in 2008, see lists of Stolpersteine in: Josefov, Malá Strana, Vršovice and Modřany
 Říčany

Regions:
 Jihočeský kraj: České Budějovice (1), Chlum u Třeboně (2), Třeboň (3)
 Karlovarský kraj: Chodov (9)
 Královéhradecký kraj: Kostelec and Orlicí (1), Náchod (5)
 Ústecký kraj: Děčín (1), Teplice (13), Žatec (3)
 Kraj Vysočina: Chotěboř (3), Havlíčkův Brod (2), Pacov (4), Senožaty (4), Třebíč (3)
 Zlínský kraj: Boršice (3), Kroměříž (9)

Denmark 
The first 12 stones were laid in Copenhagen on June 10, 2019. In Nørregade 27, Krystalgade, Bredgade, Sølvgade, Ravnsborg Tværgade, Prinsessegade, Rantzausgade, Carl Plougs Vej and Borgmestervangen 

In Odense 10 stones were laid on August 8, 2021 and 2 stones on June 9, 2022 on Buchwaldsgade, Kirkesvinget, Kochsgade, Ingrids Allé, Hunderupvej, Flakhaven, Ny Kongevej, Bangs Alle, Chr. IX’s Vej, Prinsesse Maries Allé, Store Glasvej and Hjallesevej

In Assens 2 stones were laid on June 8, 2022. In Østergade and Nørregade

In Svendborg 3 stones were laid on August 12, 2022. In Niels Juels Vej, Kullinggade and Skårup Vinkelvej

Finland
 Helsinki: 7, as of June 2021

France
 L'Aiguillon-sur-Mer
 Beaulieu-sous-la-Roche
 Bègles
 Bordeaux
 Bourneau
 Cartelègue August, 2015.
 Coux par Montendre The first stone in France for a Prisoner of War died in Germany Bamberg, laid on August, 2015.
 Cluny
  Fontaines
 Fontenay-le-Comte The first two stones in France were laid in Saint-Médard-des-Prés on September 30, 2013. 
 Fontenay-sous-Bois April, 2019
 Herrlisheim-près-Colmar April, 2019
 La Brède August, 2015. 
 Le Grand-Village-Plage August, 2015 
 Libourne April, 2019
 Longèves
 Mervent 
 Muttersholtz April, 2019
 Nieul-sur-l'Autise
 Strasbourg The first 20 stones were laid on May 1, 2019.

Germany 

 Aachen see also 
 Ahaus
 Altenbeken
 Alzey
 Andernach: 20 Stolpersteine 
 Ansbach
 Apolda: 28 stolpersteine; first memorials laid in May 2008
 Arnsberg
 Arnstadt
 Aschaffenburg
 Aschersleben
 Aßlar
 Attendorn
 Aub: 20 as of January 2010
 Aue
 Bad Berleburg: 44 stolpersteine, as of May 2013
 Bad Bentheim
 Bad Hersfeld
 Bad Homburg vor der Höhe see also 
 Bad Kissingen: stolpersteine as of June 19, 2009
 Bad Laasphe: 83 stolpersteine, as of May 2013
 Bad Langensalza
 Bad Neuenahr-Ahrweiler see also 
 Bad Saarow
 Bad Salzuflen see also 
 Bad Vilbel
 Bad Wildungen
 Bad Wimpfen
 Bad Zwesten
 Baden-Baden: 114 stolpersteine last laid on November 8, 2013; see also 
 Badenweiler
 Bamberg
 Bargteheide: one stolperstein laid as of November 26, 2009
 Barsinghausen
 Bautzen
 Beckum
 Bergisch Gladbach
 Berlin: over 8,176 stolpersteine, as of July 2018; 55,000 people deported; see also  and 
 Beverungen
 Bielefeld
 Bingen am Rhein
 Bocholt: 44 stolpersteine as of December 2009
 Bochum: 179 stolpersteine in 88 locations see also 
 Bodenheim
 Bonn: over 100 stolpersteine
 Bornheim (Frankfurt am Main)
 Borken, North Rhine-Westphalia: 2 stolpersteine laid on February 25, 2011
 Bottrop
 Braunschweig
 Bremen: see also 
 Bremerhaven: see also 
 Bretten (near Karlsruhe)
 Bruchsal 
 Bückeburg
 Bünde
 Burgdorf
 Burgkunstadt
 Burgsteinfurt
 Butzbach
 Castrop-Rauxel: 29 stolpersteine as of May 2013 laid in 5 locations. see also 
 Celle
 Chemnitz
 Coburg
 Cologne: 1,400 stolpersteine, first memorials laid in 2005
 Cottbus: 77 stolpersteine as of December 3, 2013, see also 
 Crimmitschau: 9 stolpersteine, see also 
 Dachau: 6 stolpersteine laid in November 2005
 Darmstadt
 Delitzsch
 Dietzenbach
 Dinkelsbühl
 Dirmstein: 10 stolpersteine laid in March 2009, one for a British airman murdered by a local official
 Döbeln: 5 stolpersteine laid in May 2007
 Dormagen
 Dortmund: 147 stolpersteine, as of June 2, 2009
 Dreieich
 Dresden: 34 stolpersteine, as of October 22, 2013; see also 
 Duderstadt
 Duisburg: 225 stolpersteine, as of 2009
 Düren: stolpersteine as of June 26, 2005
 Düsseldorf
 Eberswalde
 Edermünde (Besse
 Eichstetten
 Eisenach
 Eisenberg, Thuringia
 Eislingen
 Erftstadt
 Erkrath
 Erlangen
 Eschwege
 Essen: over 170 stolpersteine, first memorials laid in 2004
 Esslingen
 Estenfeld
Ettlingen
 Flensburg
 Frankenthal
 Frankfurt am Main: over 500 stolpersteine; over 12,000 Jews deported from Frankfurt
 Frankfurt (Oder): first 7 stolpersteine placed on May 8, 2006
 Frechen: currently 31 stolpersteine placed on April 3, 2009, and December 14, 2009. Placement of another 19 stolpersteine planned for December 20, 2010.
 Freiburg im Breisgau: 270 stolpersteine as of 2002
 Freising
 Friedrichroda
 Friedrichsdorf
 Gaggenau: 14 stolpersteine
 Gau-Algesheim
 Gaukönigshofen
 Gelnhausen
 Gelsenkirchen: first stolpersteine placed on July 13, 2009
 Gera
 Gerlingen
 Giessen: 126 stolpersteine at 46 places as of August 2013; see also 
 Gladbeck
 Göppingen: 31 stolpersteine
 Gotha
 Greifswald: 11 stolpersteine, all missing since their theft on the 2012 anniversary of Kristallnacht
 Grevenbroich: 3 stolpersteine; see also 
 Griesheim
 Grimma
 Gröbenzell: 1 stolperstein, placed March 22, 2012
 Großschweidnitz
 Gudensberg
 Gütersloh
 Haan
 Hachenburg: 42 stolpersteine, all Jewish victims, completed in August 2013
 Hagen
 Halle (Saale): 130 stolpersteine, as of August 25, 2009; see also 
 Hamburg: 5.536 stolpersteine, as of February, 2019; 10,000 Jews deported between 1941 and 1945
 Hamm
 Hanover: stolpersteine as of December 6, 2007
 Haselünne
 Hattingen 11 stolpersteine in 8 locations placed December 13, 2005
 Havixbeck
 Heide
 Heidelberg
 Heidenheim an der Brenz
 Heilbronn
 Hemsbach
 Herdecke
 Hermaringen
 Herzlake: 5 stolpersteine laid for the Meyer family on August 25, 2011
 Herzogenrath
 Hiddensee: 6 stolpersteine; see also 
 Hilchenbach: 12 stolpersteine as of May 2013
 Hildburghausen
 Hilden: 42 stolpersteine; first memorials placed on November 24, 2004
 Hildesheim
 Hochheim am Main
 Hofheim am Taunus
 Homberg (Efze)
 Höxter
 Hoya: 18 stolpersteine; first 3 memorials placed in 2007
 Huenfeld
 Ilmenau
 Ingelheim
 Ingolstadt: 11 stolpersteine, placed March 21, 2012
 Irsee: 3 stolpersteine
 Iserlohn
 Itzehoe
 Jena
 Joachimsthal, Brandenburg: 2 stolpersteine, as of July 18, 2007
 Kalkar
 Kall: 23 stolpersteine, all placed on August 31, 2012
 Kamen
 Kappeln
 Karlsruhe: over 140 stolpersteine; first memorials placed on March 18, 2005 (Map of Karlsruhe showing stolperstein locations)
 Karlstadt
 Katzwinkel: 1 stolperstein
 Kehl: 22 stolpersteine
 Kempten: 22 stolpersteine, as of early 2012; see also 
 Kenzingen
 Kiel: 144 stolpersteine; see also 
 Kippenheim: 16 stolpersteine; see also 
 Kirchheim unter Teck
 Kitzingen
 Kleinblittersdorf
 Klingenmünster
 Koblenz: 87 stolpersteine, as of July 9, 2012
 Köln
 Königswinter (Oberdollendorf)
 Köthen (Anhalt) 17 stolpersteine at 7 addresses, see also 
 Konstanz: 138 stolpersteine, as of September 2013; see also 
 Krefeld see also 
 Kreuztal, including suburb Littfeld: 12 stolpersteine, as of May 2013
 Kronberg im Taunus
 Kronshagen: 2 stolpersteine; see also 
 Künzelsau
 Kusel
 Ladenburg
 Lahnstein
 Lahr
  (Ward of Erftstadt): 3 stolpersteine
 Leichlingen
 Leipzig
 Lennestadt
 Leverkusen
 Limbach-Oberfrohna: 7 stolpersteine, see also 
 Lindenberg im Allgäu
 Lindow
 Lörrach: 15 Stolpersteine, see also 
 Lübeck: see also 
 Luckenwalde
 Ludwigsburg: over 12 stolpersteine; first 12 as of 2008
 Ludwigshafen
 Lüneburg: 47 stolpersteine
 Lünen: 4 stolpersteine, as of September 7, 2009
 Lutherstadt Wittenberg: 12 stolpersteine as of the end of 2012
 Magdeburg: over 70 stolpersteine; first 13 installed on March 13, 2007
 Mainbernheim
 Maintal
 Mainz: see also 
 Mannheim: 44 stolpersteine, as of May 5, 2009
 Marbach am Neckar: 1 stolperstein, as of November 24, 2014
 Marburg: 26 stolpersteine, as of September 29, 2011
 Marktbreit 
 Markkleeberg
 Meerane: 5 stolpersteine, see also 
 Meiningen
 Melsungen
 Meppen
 Merseburg: 7 stolpersteine; see also 
 Meschede: 6 stolpersteine installed on May 31, 2012
 Meschede, Wennemen: 5 stolpersteine installed on May 31, 2012
 Michelstadt: 21 stolpersteine laid on March 13, 2010; some 40 more were planned for autumn 2010 and spring 2011
 Minden
 Mönchengladbach
 Mühlacker
 Mühlhausen
 Müllheim
 Mülheim an der Ruhr
 Munich: 24 stolpersteine, as of May 17, 2013 – all on private land as the city legislated against the laying of these stones in 2004. After reconsideration, the ban was confirmed in 2015.
 Münster
 Nabburg
 Naumburg
 Nettetal-Breyell: 6 stolpersteine, laid November 11, 2010. 22 stolpersteine, laid December 10, 2013 
 Nettetal-Kaldenkirchen: 6 stolpersteine, laid February 6, 2012.  9 stolpersteine, laid July 10, 2013 5 stolpersteine, laid February 17, 2016.
 Netphen: 6 stolpersteine, as of May 2013
 Neu-Isenburg
 Neumünster
 Neuruppin: 16 stolpersteine; there were about 1,000 local euthanasia victims
 Neuss
 Neustadt an der Weinstraße
 Neuwied
 Norden
 Nordhausen
 Nordhorn
 Nördlingen
 Nuremberg
 Ober-Ramstadt: 19 stolpersteine
 Oberhausen
 Ochtrup
 Oederan: 4 stolpersteine, see also 
 Offenbach am Main: 68 stolpersteine
 Offenburg
 Oranienburg: 24 stolpersteine, as of June 28, 2008; first memorials laid in 2005
 Osnabrück
 : 14 stolpersteine; see also 
 Ostheim vor der Rhön
 Papenburg
 Pasewalk
 Pattensen
 Peine
 Perleberg: 4 stolpersteine laid June 11, 2009; see also 
 Petershagen (Eggersdorf)
 Pforzheim
 Pfullendorf
 Plauen
 Potsdam: 13 stolpersteine, first memorials laid in 2008; more to be laid on July 2, 2010
 Quakenbrück
 Querfurt: 3 stolpersteine placed Oktober 17, 2011; see also 
 Quickborn: 7 stolpersteine as of 2012
 Radebeul: 5 stolpersteine; see also 
 Rathenow: 4 stolpersteine
 Ratingen
 Ravensburg: 17 stolpersteine; see also 
 Regensburg
 Reinbek
 Remscheid
 Rendsburg
 Rödelsee
 Ronneburg, Thuringia: 3 stolpersteine; see also 
 Rostock
 Rotenburg an der Fulda
 Rudolstadt
 Saarbrücken: 32 stolpersteine; see also 
 Salzkotten
 Sankt Wendel: 20 stolpersteine
 Sassnitz
 Schierling
 Schleswig
 Schlüchtern: 18 stolpersteine as of 2021
 Schöneiche
 Schorndorf
 Schriesheim: 21 stolpersteine; see also 
 Schwabach
 Schwäbisch Gmünd
 Schwäbisch Hall
 Schwelm: 6 stolpersteine; see also 
 Schwerin
 Schwerte
 Segnitz
 Selm: more than 9 stolpersteine, as of September 12, 2007
 Senftenberg: 20 stolpersteine, as of November 11, 2011
 Siegen: 83 stolpersteine, as of May 17, 2013
 Singen: 73 Stolpersteine; see also 
 Soest: 35 stolpersteine in 21 places
 Sollingen
 Sömmerda
 Stegen
 Stendal
 Steinfurt
 Stockach see also 
 Stralsund
 Stuttgart: over 500 stolpersteine in the city and outlying suburbs
 Sulingen
 Süßen
 Teupitz
 Telgte
Themar, 36 Stolpersteine as of August 2018
 Treuenbrietzen
 Trier
 Troisdorf
 Tuttlingen: 5 stolpersteine; see also 
 Überlingen
 Ueckermünde: 6 stolpersteine; see also 
 Unna: 100 stolpersteine, as of June 4, 2012
Usingen
 Vechta
 Verden an der Aller: see also 
 Viersen: 18 stolpersteine
 Viersen-Dülken: 10 stolpersteine laid January 15, 2009
 Viersen-Willich-: 7 stolpersteine laid February 6, 2012
 Vilshofen an der Donau
 Vlotho
 Waiblingen
 Waibstadt: 7 stolpersteine placed April 17, 2012
 Walldorf
 Weeze: 6 stolpersteine
 Weimar
 Weimar (Lahn)
 Weingarten, see: Stolpersteine in Weingarten
 Weinheim
 Werne
 Wertheim
 Weisenheim am Berg
 Weißenfels
 Wernigerode
 Wetzlar
 Wiesbaden: 214 stolpersteine, 2009
 Wiltingen
 Wissen
 Witten: 108 stolpersteine; see also 
 Wittenberge: 25 stolpersteine; see also 
 Worms
 Wuppertal
 Würselen
 Würzburg: 269 stolpersteine, as of May 15, 2010 
 Xanten
 Zehdenick
 Zella-Mehlis
 Zittau
 Zons
 Zossen
 Zwickau: 32 stolpersteine, see also 
 Zwingenberg
 Zwönitz: 1 stolpersteine

Greece 
 Thessaloniki: 5 stolpersteine at the Harbour of Thessaloniki installed October 2016; about 160 in front of the school at Vasilissis Olgas st. 3
 Veria: 6 stolpersteine in June 2019

Hungary 

 Balatonfüred
 Budapest: first 3 stolpersteine installed on April 27, 2007
 Esztergom
 Kiskunhalas
 Kisvarda
 Makó
 Mátészalka
 Nagykanizsa
 Nagykőrös
 Pécs
 Szeged
 Szombathely
 Újfehértó
 Zalaegerszeg

Ireland
Dublin

Italy 

 Adro
 Ancona
 L'Aquila: 1
 Bergamo
 Bolzano: 15 stolpersteine
 Belgioioso
 Brescia
 Calvagese della Riviera: 1
 Collebeato: 1
 Chieti:
 Cuneo 
 Doberdò del Lago
 Genoa: 3 stolpersteine
 Faenza
 Finale Ligure: 4 stolpersteine, as of January 2019
 Firenze: 24 stolpersteine, as of January 2020
 Forlí
 Gorizia
 Grosseto
 Lanciano: 4
 Lecco: 2
 Lecce: 3, as of January 2020
 Livorno: 18 stolpersteine, as of January 2021
 Mantua
 Meran
 Milan: 90 stolpersteine, as of January 2020
 Muggiò
 Naples: 9 stolpersteine, as of January 2020
 Ostuni
 Padua
 Parma
 Pavia
 Pescara
 Pisa: 4 stolpersteine, as of January 2017
 Prato
 Premolo
 Ravenna
 Rome: 249 stolpersteine
 Ronchi dei Legionari
 Salò
 Sant'Angelo Lodigiano
 Sarezzo
 Schio
 Siena
 Teramo
 Turin: 85
Trieste
 Venice: 78, as of January 2019
 Vicenza
 Vigevano
 Viterbo

Latvia
 Riga, 4 stolpersteine, installed 2018

Lithuania
 Kaunas, 9 stolpersteine, installed 2016
 Panevėžys, 4 stolpersteine, installed 2016
 Šiauliai, 2 stolpersteine, installed 2016
 Vilnius, 8 stolpersteine, installed 2016

Luxembourg

 Belvaux: 1 stolperstein, installed on 6 November 2015 
 Differdange: 38 stolpersteine, installed on 28 October 2014 (15) and 5 November 2015 (23) 
 Esch-sur-Alzette: 14 stolpersteine, installed on 22 October 2013
 Ettelbrück: 1 Stolperschwelle, installed on 25 January 2013
 Mondorf-les-Bains: 11 stolpersteine, installed on 6 November 2015, two of them for murdered anti-fascist resistants
 Remich: 17 stolpersteine, installed on 24 June 2016

The Netherlands 

Over 100,000 Jews and over 200 Romani from the Netherlands were killed by the Nazis.
 Almelo
 Amersfoort
 Amsterdam
 Assen
 Bedum
 Beesd
 Bennekom
 Berkelland (Borculo)
 Bernisse
 Borne (Overijssel)
 Breda
 Brielle
 Burgh
 Bussum
 Culemborg
 Dirksland
 Doesburg
 Domburg
 Dordrecht
 Drunen
 Eethen
 Echt-Susteren
 Eindhoven
 Elst
 Emmen
 Enschede
 Etten-Leur
 Geertruidenberg
 Geffen
 Goirle
 Gorinchem
 Gouda
 Grave
 Groningen
 Grootegast
 Haaksbergen
 Haarlem
 The Hague
 Hardenberg
 Haren, Groningen
 Harlingen
 Hattem
 's-Heerenberg
 Heerlen: 25 stolpersteine installed August 25, 2012
 Heeze-Leende
 Hellendoorn
 Hellevoetsluis
 's-Hertogenbosch
 Herwijnen
 Hilversum
 Hof van Twente
 Hoogezand-Sappemeer
 Kampen (Overijssel)
 Kerkrade
 Leiden
 Lochem
 Losser
 Maarssen
 Maastricht
 Meppel
 Middelburg
 Middelharnis
 Moergestel
 Monster
 Naaldwijk
 Neder-Betuwe (Ochten)
 Neerijnen (Ophemert)
 Nieuwkuijk
 Nijkerk
 Nijmegen
 Nunspeet
 Ochten
 Oisterwijk
 Oldambt
 Ommen
 Oost Gelre (Groenlo)
 Oosterhout
 Ophemert
 Oss
 Oude-Tonge
 Ouddorp
 Pekela
 Renkum
 Rijssen-Holten
 De Ronde Venen
 Roosendaal
 Rossum (Gelderland)
 Rotterdam
 Schagen
 Sint-Michielsgestel
 Slochteren
 Soest
 Spijkenisse
 Stadskanaal
 Súdwest-Fryslân (Sneek)
 Tiel
 Tilburg
 Tynaarlo
 Urk
 Utrecht
 Vaals
 Valkenburg aan de Geul
 Veere
 Veghel
 Venlo: first stolperstein installed on June 22, 2012
 Vianen (Utrecht)
 Vlijmen
 Vlissingen
 Weesp
 Werkendam
 Westvoorne (Oostvoorne)
 Wierden
 Winterswijk
 Woudrichem
 Zaanstad (Zaandam)
 Zaltbommel
 Zevenbergen
 Zierikzee
 Zuidlaren
 Zutphen
 Zwolle

Norway 
773 Jews were taken in Norway and sent to Germany. 38 of them survived. As of April 2020, there are 606 stolpersteine in Norway.
Cities, amongst others, were stolpersteine have been placed:
 Bergen: 10 stolpersteine were laid on 14 June 2014.
 Elverum: 7 stolpersteine were laid on 19 August 2013.
 Harstad: 3 stolpersteine were laid on 16 June 2014.
 Haugesund: 2 stolpersteine were laid on the 75 year anniversary of Kristallnacht, 9 November 2013, in memory of Moritz Rabinowitz and Georg Rechenberg.
 Hurum: 6 stolpersteine on laid on 12 June 2014.
 Hønefoss: 8 stolpersteine laid on 12 June 2014.
 Larvik: 9 stolpersteine laid on 5 September 2012.
 Mosjøen: 3 stolpersteine were laid on 20 August 2013.
 Narvik: 9 stolpersteine were laid on 16 June 2014.
 Oslo: 101 stolpersteine. The first ones were laid in August 2010.
 Skien: 2 stolpersteine were laid on 13 June 2014.
 Stavanger: 14 stolpersteine.
 Tromsø: 14 stolpersteine laid on 17 June 2014.
 Trondheim: 15 stolpersteine. The first ones were laid in September 2012.
 Tønsberg: 17 stolpersteine were laid on 13 June 2014.
 Kristiansund: 19 Stolpersteine were laid on the 9th of June 2016.

Moldova 
 Chișinău: 2 stolpersteine

Poland 

 Biała Podlaska: 3 stolpersteine
 Bytom
 Łomża: 2 stolpersteine
 Mińsk Mazowiecki: one stolperstein
 Raczki: 5 stolpersteine
 Słubice
 Wrocław

Romania
 Porț, 6 stolperstein, collocated on 7 July 2014
 Timișoara, 1 stolperstein, collocated on 23 May 2014

Russia
 Kromy, Oryol Oblast
 Oryol: stolpersteine were laid on July 30, 2013.

Serbia
 Belgrade, collocated on July 5, 2022
 Novi Bečej
 Zrenjanin, collocated on August 18, 2021

Slovakia
44 stolpersteine were installed in Slovakia between 2012 and 2014 with the help of local organisation Antikomplex.sk.
 Banská Bystrica 
 Bratislava 
 Nitra
 Brezno 
 Častá 
 Halič 
 Komárno 
 Lučenec 
 Prešov 
 Prievidza
 Ratková

Slovenia 
 Ljubljana, 23 stolpersteine 
 Maribor, 12 stolpersteine
 Murska Sobota, 11 stolpersteine
 Lendava, 22 stolpersteine

Spain 

 Manresa
 Navàs
 Madrid
 Sabadell
 Barcelona

Sweden 

 Stockholm, 3 stolpersteine
 Malmö, 3 stolpersteine

Switzerland
 Kreuzlingen: stolpersteine were laid on September 8, 2013.

Ukraine 

 Pereiaslav: 4 stolpersteine were laid on July 3, 2009, the first ones installed in the country.
 Rivne: 5 stolpersteine.
 Kyiv

United Kingdom 

 London: the first stolpersteine was laid in Golden Square, Soho in May 2022 to honour Ada von Dantzig.

Imitations 

In several cities there are imitations of Stolpersteine although the concept of Gunter Demnig is protected by copyright and registered as a Trademark all over Europe.

 Austria: In Vienna there are more 1.000 memorial plaques dedicated to the victims of the Nazi regime.
 Belgium: Imitations are collocated in Mechelen in Flanders.
 Czech Republic: Imitations can be found in Benešov, Brno, Liberec and Židlochovice. Though, the majority of the Brno memorial plaques are original Stolpersteine by Demnig himself.
 Netherlands: Imitations can be found in a.o. Amersfoort, Bellingwedde, Veendam and Vught. They are called "Herdenkingstenen" and are made of black marmor.

See also 
 Gunter Demnig – the German artist who conceived the Stolperstein Project ("Projekt Stolpersteine") and has installed the most memorial plaques

References

External links 
 Project homepage 
 Stolperstein memorials
 Gunter Demnig and the stolperstein memorials Jewish Tribune, official website
 Stolperstein article at Shoa (2005) 
 Visualisation of stolperstein locations stored in OpenStreetMap

 *